Bertha of Cornouaille (fl. 1125–56), also known as Bertha of Brittany, was the Duchess of Brittany between 1148 until her death and Dowager Countess of Richmond. Bertha was the elder daughter of Conan III of Brittany by Maude, the illegitimate daughter of King Henry I of England. She was the last member of the Breton House of Cornouaille to reign over Brittany.

Life
Bertha was the daughter of Duke Conan III of Brittany. She married the son of Stephen of Treguier, Alan the Black and she lived in England with Alan until his death in 1146. Alan would eventually become Earl of Richmond. After Alan's death she returned to Brittany as Dowager Countess of Richmond and eventually married Odo II, Viscount of Porhoët. When her father Duke Conan III died, on his deathbed Conan III renounced Bertha's brother Hoèl as heir, and designated Bertha as his heiress. On Conan III's death she became hereditary Duchess of Brittany.

Family
In her first marriage, by 1138, Bertha was married to Alan le Noir  

Bertha and Alan had three children:
Conan IV, Duke of Brittany, b. 1138, their son and heir, as Duke of Brittany and Earl of Richmond
 Constance, who married Alan III, Viscount of Rohan
 Enoguen, abbess of St. Sulpice

Bertha married her second husband, Odo, Viscount of Porhoet in about 1148. Bertha and Odo had three children:
 Geoffroy.
 Adelaide (died in 1220), Abbess of Fontevrault, mistress of Henry II, King of England.
 Alix

Succession
Bertha died between 1158 and 1164, and with her death the ducal throne passed to her son Conan.

Notes

References

References

12th-century deaths
12th-century dukes of Brittany
12th-century women rulers
12th-century Breton women
Duchesses of Brittany
Date of birth unknown
Date of death unknown
Place of birth unknown
Place of death unknown
Dukes of Brittany
Porhoët family